Gigantopalimna benetrixae is a species of beetle in the family Cerambycidae, and the only species in the genus Gigantopalimna. It was described by Breuning in 1964.

References

Ancylonotini
Beetles described in 1964
Monotypic Cerambycidae genera